Sodus Center is a hamlet in the Town of Sodus, Wayne County, New York, United States. It is located four miles (6 km) southeast of the Village of Sodus, at an elevation of 417 feet (127 m). The primary cross roads where the hamlet is located are Sodus Center Road (CR 241), Barclay Road and Main Street.

A United States Post Office was located in Sodus Center with a ZIP Code of 14554. It permanently closed on November 25, 1995.

The Red Brick Church was listed on the National Register of Historic Places in 1997.

References

Hamlets in Wayne County, New York
Hamlets in New York (state)
Populated places in Wayne County, New York